The Harlow E. Bundy House (also known as the Bundy Museum of History and Art) is a historic house located at 129 Main Street in Binghamton, Broome County, New York.

Description and history 
It was built in 1893, and is a -story, irregularly massed, Queen Anne style frame dwelling. It features cut stone veneer, a variety of decorative shingles, and a tall conical corner tower. It was built by Binghamton businessman Harlow Bundy (1856-1914), who owned the Bundy Manufacturing Company, a predecessor of IBM.

It was listed on the National Register of Historic Places on May 11, 2011.

Bundy Museum of History and Art
The Bundy Museum of History and Art features exhibits about the Bundy Manufacturing Company and its founders including a display of time recording clocks in a recreation of the Bundy Manufacturing Company's 1893 World's Fair booth; a gallery with ancestral and ceremonial African artifact; a vintage 20th-century barber shop room; changing exhibits about local history; and the Southern Tier Broadcasters Hall of Fame which honors such pioneers as Rod Serling, Richard Deacon and Bill Parker. The museum's open art gallery for works by upcoming as well as established artists. The museum also hosts the Rod Serling Archive, with original wire images, TV and film props, memorabilia and personal items.

References

External links

Bundy Museum of History and Art website

Museums in Broome County, New York
Houses on the National Register of Historic Places in New York (state)
Queen Anne architecture in New York (state)
Houses completed in 1893
Houses in Binghamton, New York
History museums in New York (state)
Art museums and galleries in New York (state)
National Register of Historic Places in Broome County, New York